Théo Sainte-Luce (born 20 October 1998) is a French professional footballer who plays as a left-back for  club Montpellier.

Career
A youth product of Chauny, Sainte-Luce joined Nîmes at the age of 17. He made his professional debut for Nîmes in a 3–1 Ligue 1 win over Rennes on 9 April 2019.

On 23 May 2022, Sainte-Luce signed a pre-contract agreement with Nîmes's rivals Montpellier.

Personal life
Born in metropolitan France, Sainte-Luce is of Guadeloupean descent.

References

External links
 
 Nîmes Profile
 
 

1998 births
Living people
Sportspeople from Aisne
Association football fullbacks
French footballers
French people of Guadeloupean descent
Black French sportspeople
Ligue 1 players
Championnat National players
Championnat National 2 players
Championnat National 3 players
Ligue 2 players
Nîmes Olympique players
Gazélec Ajaccio players
Red Star F.C. players
Montpellier HSC players
Footballers from Hauts-de-France